Kogan is a rural town and locality in the Western Downs Region, Queensland, Australia. In the  the locality of Kogan had a population of 190 people.

Geography 
The locality of Kogan is shaped like an upside-down U with the locality of Beelbee almost enclosed by Kogan. The town of Kogan is in the north-west of the locality. From the town there are four arterial roads:
 Kogan Condamine Road towards the north-west to Montrose and eventually to Condamine
 Warra Kogan Road towards the north-east to Warra
 Dalby Kogan Road towards the south-east to Macalister and eventually to Dalby
 Tara Kogan Road towards the south-west to Tara
In the north-east of the locality, the Condamine River flows from south to north along Kogan's boundary with Warra, while Wilkie Creek flowing from south to north (a tributary of the Condamine) forms Kogan's boundary with Macalister. Wambo Creek flows from south to north-west through the south-western part of the locality and is eventually a tributary of the Condamine River.

Kogan Creek flows from south to north through the locality passing through the township of Kogan; it is also a tributary of the Condamine River.

The lower flatter land in Kogan (approx 350 metres above sea level) is used for grazing, while higher peaks of approx 400metres remain as bushland. Most of Kogan is freehold land with the exceptions of Dalby State Forest, Braemer State Forest, both in the eastern part of the locality.

Geologically, Kogan is part of the Surat Basin.

The predominant land use is grazing on native vegetation.

History 
The name Kogan derives from an early pastoral run called Kogan Creek owned variously by J.E. Barney (-1848), Joseph King (1838-1849), and Colin J. McKenzie (1849-). The name probably comes from Kogai, one of the Aboriginal tribes from the district.

It was a changing station on the Dalby-Roma coach route prior to the construction of the Western railway line. It had a hotel, the Kogan Inn, at that time, but this closed after the demise of the coach route.

Kogan Provisional School opened on 4 October 1897 and closed about 1899. It reopened in 1905 and became Kogan State School in 1910.

Perth Provisional School opened circa November 1910. In 1922 it became a half-time school (meaning a single teacher shared between two schools) with Brooklyn Provisional School, which opened circa October 1922. Circa November 1925 the Brooklyn school closed and Perth school returned to full-time status, only to close circa November 1926. The location of these schools were described as "via Kogan".

Kogan North State School opened on 18 June 1936 and closed on 30 April 1944. The school's location was described "via Kogan".

Millbank State School opened on 24 January 1938 and closed on 28 January 1957. The school's location was described "via Kogan".

The Wilkie Creek coal mine commenced operation in 1994. It was bought by Peabody Energy in 2002.

In the 2011 census, Kogan had a population of 355 people.

In the  the locality of Kogan had a population of 190 people.

Economy 
All of Kogan and Beelbee are subject to petroleum leases and there are many coal seam gas wells in south-east Kogan with associated pipelines.

The Wilkie Creek coal mine is located on the eastern boundary of the locality. It is an open cut mine producing a thermal coal that is low in nitrogen and sulphur. The coal is then taken by rail to the Port of Brisbane from where it is taken by ship to Asia where it is used in power generation.

There are a number of electricity generators in Kogan:

 gas-powered Darling Downs Power Station 

 gas-powered Braemer Power Station with
 Braemar 1 Power Station
 Braemar 2 Power Station

 gas-powered Daandine Power Station

 Darling Downs Solar Farm
There are a number of homesteads in the locality, including:

 Bothwell Park
 Brooklyn
 Coolwater
 Eden Vale
 Emoh Ruo
 Falconhurst
 Glencoe
 Greenpatch
 Honeyvale
 Iona
 Kainama
 Kaiyuta
 Pingelly
 Smitham
 Topwater
 Wecunna
 Wonga Lea

Education 
Kogan State School is a government primary (Prep-6) school for boys and girls at High Street. In 2015, there were 47 students enrolled with 3 teachers (2 full-time equivalent). In 2018, the school had an enrolment of 24 students with 2 teachers and 5 non-teaching staff (2 full-time equivalent).

There is no secondary school in Kogan. The nearest secondary schools are Chinchilla State High School (to Year 12) in Chinchilla to the north-west, Jandowae State School (to Year 10) in Jandowae to the north-east, Dalby State High School (to Year 12) in Dalby to the east, and Tara Shire State College (to Year 12) in neighbouring Tara to the south-west.

Facilities 
Kogan District Rural Fire Brigade is on the eastern corner of High Street and Henry Street.

Hugh Sawrey 
Australian painter Hugh Sawrey spent many years in the Kogan area. He often painted murals on local buildings to pay his bills. He first visited the town after he returned from military service in World War II, seeking work on cattle stations. He painted murals for the lounge of the Kogan Hotel and the ceiling of the Kogan post office.

In 2009, a documentary was made about Sawrey titled Banjo Paterson with a Paintbrush. On 3 October 2009, the documentary premiered at the Art at Kogan festival in the presence of the Queensland Governor, Penelope Wensley.

Sawrey is commemorated in Kogan with a sculpture and walkway. The sculpture titled Bush Friendship is on the Kogan-Condamine Road and features Sawrey with his friend Nelson "Darkie" Dwyer, the former publican in Kogan. It is a lifesize sculpture in bronze and depicts the two men sitting across a table from one another, playing cards (as they often did). The sculpture forms part of the Hugh Sawrey Walk of Fame, which was funded by the Queensland Government as part of the Q150 celebrations. A sculpture of a horse with a rugged stockman on his back and the whip cutting up above his head (themes that Sawrey often painted) forms the entrance to the Kogan Community Centre.

References

Further reading

External links 

 

Towns in Queensland
Western Downs Region
Localities in Queensland